Qurchay (also Romanized as Qūrchāy; also known as Qūrī Chāy) is a village in Nezamabad Rural District, in the Central District of Azadshahr County, Golestan Province, Iran. At the 2006 census, its population was 3,325, in 825 families.

References 

Populated places in Azadshahr County